Edmund Faustyn Biernacki (19 December 1866 in Opoczno – 29 December 1911 in Lwów) was a Polish physician.

Biernacki was the first one to note a relationship between the sedimentation rate of red blood cells in a human blood sample and the general condition of the organism. This method, known as the Biernacki Reaction, is used worldwide to assess erythrocyte sedimentation rate (ESR), which is one of the major blood tests.

References

See also
 Pathology
 List of pathologists

1866 births
1911 deaths
19th-century Polish physicians
Polish pathologists
Polish academics
Polish neurologists
Philosophers of science
People from Opoczno
Burials at Lychakiv Cemetery